Nostalgia is the third studio album by Congolese-born singer TRESOR. It was released on 25 January 2019 through his label VII Recordings. The album features African artists AKA, Kwesta, Lokua Kanza, Beatenberg, Mafikizolo, The Soil, Sauti Sol and Msaki. The 13-track album won Best afro pop album at the 25th South African Music Awards in 2019 and was certified Gold by the Recording Industry of South Africa (RiSA) on 26 September 2020.

Background
TRESOR referred to the album as his most personal project. Explaining his album:
Nostalgia is a sonic trip into my childhood; I basically went back into the music era I grew up in, listening to the music that shaped who I am from the likes of Hugh Masekela, Papa Wemba and Chico Twala. I just boxed all that music and interpreted in a way that allows me to show people what moulded me into the artist I’ve become as an adult.

Singles
The album's lead single "Silale" was released on 6 September 2018 and featured South African a cappella group The Soil. The single was certified Gold by the Recording Industry of South Africa.

"Aphrodite" is the second song that was released from Nostlagia, after The Soil-assisted "Silale," which came out in early September. The song featured Afro pop band Beatenberg. TRESOR telling  People Magazine about the song: 
I am truly thrilled to share this collaboration with my Beatenberg brothers. The song was written and produced in Cape Town throughout summer last year. Matthew Field (of Beatenberg) and I wanted to create a musical piece that reflects the sounds that we both grew up listening to. We both love Greek mythology and history, so we wanted to play with idea of falling deeply in love with Aphrodite, an ancient Greek goddess associated with love, beauty, pleasure, and procreation. We had so much fun making this song and I think we created something truly magical. Excited to share it with the world. The song was certified 4x Platinum by the Recording Industry of South Africa.

The fourth song "Electric Night" featured South African rapper AKA. TRESOR expressing about the song:
This new song with AKA will remind you of the bubble gum era. I’m really excited about how this song came about.

The song was certified Gold by the Recording Industry of South Africa.

The eleventh song, "Sondela" featured South African singer Msaki. The song was nominated for record of the year at the 26th South African Music Awards and was certified 5x Platinum by the Recording Industry of South Africa. The music video was released on 13 April 2019 and was directed by Marty Bleazard under creative direction of Tresor's references to Beyoncé's iconic Vogue Magazine takeover in September 2018. The music video reached 1 million views on YouTube three months after its release.

Track listing

Release history

Accolades

Certifications

References

2019 albums
Tresor (singer) albums